Kazuki Higa (born 23 April 1995) is a Japanese professional golfer. He has won six times on the Japan Golf Tour, as well as topping the money list in 2022.

Professional career
Higa attended Tohoku Fukushi University and turned professional in late 2017. Since turning professional, he has played primarily on the Japan Golf Tour. His first win was at the 2019 RIZAP KBC Augusta. He won again in 2021 at the Shigeo Nagashima Invitational Sega Sammy Cup.

2022: Four wins and money list title
Higa started off the season by winning the Kansai Open Golf Championship in April. He also won the BMW Japan Golf Tour Championship Mori Building Cup in June. In September, Higa won the Shinhan Donghae Open, an event also sanctioned by the Asian Tour and the Korean Tour. He shot a final-round 65 to win by two shots. He claimed his fourth victory of the season at the Dunlop Phoenix Tournament in November. He shot a final round 64 to win by three shots ahead of Mito Pereira. Higa ended the 2022 season as the Japan Golf Tour money list winner and earned status to play on the 2023 European Tour.

Amateur wins
2017 Neighbors Trophy Team Championship (individual winner), Tohoku Amateur Championship, Kanto Collegiate Championship

Source:

Professional wins (10)

Japan Golf Tour wins (6)

1Co-sanctioned by the Asian Tour and the Korean Tour

Japan Challenge Tour wins (1)

Asian Development Tour wins (2)

1Co-sanctioned by the Professional Golf Tour of India
2Co-sanctioned by the Professional Golf of Malaysia Tour

Other wins (1)
2018 Kyusyu Open

Results in major championships

CUT = missed the half-way cut

Team appearances
Amateur
Eisenhower Trophy (representing Japan): 2016
Neighbors Trophy Team Championship (representing Japan): 2013, 2015, 2017 (winners)

References

External links

Japanese male golfers
Japan Golf Tour golfers
Universiade medalists in golf
Medalists at the 2015 Summer Universiade
Medalists at the 2017 Summer Universiade
Sportspeople from Okinawa Prefecture
1995 births
Living people
Universiade gold medalists for Japan
Universiade silver medalists for Japan